The fixed end moments are reaction moments developed in a beam member under certain load conditions with both ends fixed. A beam with both ends fixed is statically indeterminate to the 3rd degree, and any structural analysis method applicable on statically indeterminate beams can be used to calculate the fixed end moments.

Examples 
In the following examples, clockwise moments are positive.

The two cases with distributed loads can be derived from the case with concentrated load by integration. Then,

Where the expressions within the integrals on the right hand sides are the fixed end moments caused by the concentrated load .

For the case with linearly distributed load of maximum intensity ,

See also 
 Moment distribution method
 Statically Indeterminate
 Slope deflection method
 Matrix method

References 

Structural analysis